Darakeh (also Romanized as Derkeh) is a village in Khanmirza Rural District, Khanmirza District, Lordegan County, Chaharmahal and Bakhtiari Province, Iran. At the 2006 census, its population was 282, in 57 families.

References 

Populated places in Lordegan County